Glyphodes is a genus of moths of the family Crambidae described by Achille Guenée in 1854.

Species
Glyphodes actorionalis Walker, 1859
Glyphodes agathalis (Walker, 1859)
Glyphodes amphipeda (Meyrick, 1939)
Glyphodes aniferalis Hampson, 1909
Glyphodes anomala Janse, 1928
Glyphodes apiospila (Turner, 1922)
Glyphodes argyraspides (Tams, 1941)
Glyphodes argyritis Hampson, 1912
Glyphodes aurantivittalis Munroe, 1960
Glyphodes badialis (Walker, 1859)
Glyphodes basifascialis Hampson, 1899
Glyphodes bicolor (Swainson, 1821)
Glyphodes bicoloralis Strand, 1912
Glyphodes bilunalis (Snellen, 1895)
Glyphodes bipunctalis Leech, 1889
Glyphodes bitjealis Strand, 1920
Glyphodes bitriangulalis Gaede, 1917
Glyphodes bivitralis Guenée, 1854
Glyphodes bocchorialis Hampson, 1912
Glyphodes boseae Saalmüller, 1880
Glyphodes bradleyi (Whalley, 1962)
Glyphodes cadeti Guillermet in Viette & Guillermet, 1996
Glyphodes caeruleiceps Hampson, 1912
Glyphodes caesalis Walker, 1859
Glyphodes callipona (Turner, 1908)
Glyphodes callizona (Meyrick, 1894)
Glyphodes canthusalis Walker, 1859
Glyphodes chalcicraspis Hampson, 1912
Glyphodes chilka Moore, 1888
Glyphodes chlorophylalis Hampson, 1912
Glyphodes chrysialis (Stoll, 1790)
Glyphodes confiniodes Amsel, 1956
Glyphodes conjunctalis Walker, 1866
Glyphodes convolvulalis (Sepp, 1848)
Glyphodes cosmarcha Meyrick, 1887
Glyphodes crameralis Snellen, 1880
Glyphodes crithealis (Walker, 1859)
Glyphodes cupripennalis Hampson, 1896
Glyphodes cyanomichla (Meyrick, 1899)
Glyphodes delicatalis Schaus, 1924
Glyphodes desmialis Mabille, 1900
Glyphodes difficilalis Strand, 1912
Glyphodes dinichealis (Walker, 1859)
Glyphodes diplocyma Hampson, 1912
Glyphodes doleschalii Lederer, 1863
Glyphodes duplicalis Inoue, Munroe & Mutuura, 1981
Glyphodes duponti de Joannis, 1915
Glyphodes dysallactalis Hampson, 1896
Glyphodes eribotesalis (Walker, 1859)
Glyphodes ernalis Swinhoe, 1894
Glyphodes euchlorisalis (Hampson, 1918)
Glyphodes eudoxia J. F. G. Clarke, 1971
Glyphodes eurygania Druce, 1902
Glyphodes expansialis Strand, 1912
Glyphodes extorris Dognin, 1905
Glyphodes fenestrata Inoue, 1996
Glyphodes flavizonalis Hampson, 1898
Glyphodes floridalis (Fernald, 1901)
Glyphodes formosanus Shibuya, 1928
Glyphodes gaujonialis (Dognin, 1905)
Glyphodes grandisalis Druce, 1902
Glyphodes heliconialis (Guenée, 1854)
Glyphodes inclusalis Gaede, 1917
Glyphodes inflamatalis (Hampson, 1912)
Glyphodes integralis (Lederer, 1863)
Glyphodes interruptalis (Amsel, 1950)
Glyphodes iridescens Rothschild, 1915
Glyphodes jaculalis Snellen, 1894
Glyphodes kunupialis Janse, 1928
Glyphodes lachesis Butler, 1882
Glyphodes lacustralis Moore, 1867
Glyphodes loloalis Strand, 1912
Glyphodes lupinalis (Schaus, 1927)
Glyphodes luzonica (Sauber in Semper, 1899)
Glyphodes magnificalis Kenrick, 1912
Glyphodes margaritaria (Clerck, 1764)
Glyphodes mascarenalis de Joannis, 1906
Glyphodes mesozona Lower, 1901
Glyphodes metastictalis Hampson, 1899
Glyphodes microta Meyrick, 1889
Glyphodes mijamo Viette, 1989
Glyphodes militaris Munroe, 1976
Glyphodes minimalis Hampson, 1896
Glyphodes multilinealis Kenrick, 1907
Glyphodes naralis C. Felder, R. Felder & Rogenhofer, 1875
Glyphodes negatalis (Walker, 1859)
Glyphodes nitidaria (Pagenstecher, 1899)
Glyphodes nigribasalis Caradja, 1925
Glyphodes nigricincta Kenrick, 1912
Glyphodes nilgirica Hampson, 1896
Glyphodes obscura Munroe, 1959
Glyphodes ochripictalis Strand, 1912
Glyphodes onychinalis (Guenée, 1854)
Glyphodes orbiferalis Hampson, 1896
Glyphodes oriolalis Viette, 1958
Glyphodes pandectalis Snellen, 1895
Glyphodes paramicalis Kenrick, 1917
Glyphodes parallelalis Gaede, 1917
Glyphodes paucilinealis Kenrick, 1907
Glyphodes perelegans (Hampson, 1899)
Glyphodes perspicualis Kenrick, 1907
Glyphodes phormingopa (Meyrick, 1934)
Glyphodes phytonalis (Walker, 1859)
Glyphodes polystrigalis (Hampson, 1918)
Glyphodes pradolalis (Dognin, 1897)
Glyphodes praefulgida E. Hering, 1903
Glyphodes principalis Walker, 1865
Glyphodes prothymalis Swinhoe, 1892
Glyphodes proximalis Snellen, 1899
Glyphodes pryeri Butler, 1879
Glyphodes pseudocaesalis Kenrick, 1912
Glyphodes pulverulentalis Hampson, 1896
Glyphodes pyloalis Walker, 1859
Glyphodes quadrifascialis Hampson, 1899
Glyphodes quadrimaculalis Bremer & Grey, 1853
Glyphodes quadristigmalis Kenrick, 1907
Glyphodes rhombalis Viette, 1957
Glyphodes rioalis (Schaus, 1920)
Glyphodes rotundalis (Snellen, 1901)
Glyphodes royalis Marion, 1954
Glyphodes rubrocinctalis (Guenée, 1854)
Glyphodes sanguimarginalis (Hampson, 1899)
Glyphodes scheffleri Strand, 1912
Glyphodes serenalis Snellen, 1880
Glyphodes serosalis (Dognin, 1897)
Glyphodes shafferorum Viette, 1987
Glyphodes sibillalis Walker, 1859
Glyphodes speculifera Druce, 1902
Glyphodes stictoperalis (Hampson, 1913)
Glyphodes stolalis Guenée, 1854
Glyphodes streptostigma Hampson, 1899
Glyphodes strialis (Wang, 1963)
Glyphodes subamicalis T. B. Fletcher, 1910
Glyphodes subcrameralis Pagenstecher, 1900
Glyphodes summaperta (Dyar, 1925)
Glyphodes sycina (Tams, 1941)
Glyphodes terealis Walker, 1859
Glyphodes tolimalis (Schaus, 1924)
Glyphodes toulgoetalis Marion, 1954
Glyphodes umbria Hampson, 1898
Glyphodes vagilinea Hampson, 1912
Glyphodes vertumnalis (Guenée, 1854)
Glyphodes viettealis (Marion, 1954)
Glyphodes virginalis Rebel, 1915
Glyphodes westermani Snellen, 1877
Glyphodes xanthonota (Meyrick, 1936)
Glyphodes xanthostola Hampson, 1910
Glyphodes zenkeralis Strand, 1912

Selected former species
Glyphodes alboscapulalis (Swinhoe, 1917)
Glyphodes itysalis Walker, 1859
Glyphodes cleonadalis (Swinhoe, 1904)
Glyphodes crameralis Guenée, 1854
Glyphodes dermatalis C. Felder, R. Felder & Rogenhofer, 1875
Glyphodes exquisitalis Kenrick, 1907
Glyphodes hilaralis (Walker, 1859)
Glyphodes incomposita Bethune-Baker, 1909
Glyphodes malgassalis Mabille, 1900
Glyphodes megalopa Meyrick, 1889
Glyphodes savyalis (Legrand, 1966)

References

 
Spilomelinae
Crambidae genera
Taxa named by Achille Guenée